The Battle of Donbas is an ongoing military offensive that is part of the wider eastern Ukraine campaign of the 2022 Russian invasion of Ukraine. The battle began on 18 April 2022 between the armed forces of Russia and Ukraine for control of the Donbas provinces (oblasts) of Donetsk and Luhansk. Military analysts consider the battle to be part of the second strategic phase of the invasion.

Russia's initial strategy in the sector was to encircle Ukrainian troops in the Donbas and to annex the entire Donetsk and Luhansk Oblasts to the Russian-backed separatist states of the Donetsk People's Republic (DPR) and Luhansk People's Republic (LPR), while the Ukrainian aim is to liberate occupied territories.

By 23 June 2022, Russian officials claimed to control 55% of Donetsk oblast. By 3 July, Russia claimed to control all of Luhansk oblast, with Russian and separatist forces controlling the cities of Mariupol, Sievierodonetsk, Lysychansk, Rubizhne, and many others. In September 2022, during the counteroffensive, Ukraine recaptured Bilohorivka, a village close to Lysychansk in the Luhansk Oblast and the cities of Lyman and Sviatohirsk in the Donetsk region. By 16 January 2023, Russia had captured Soledar.

Background 

The Donbas region had been the site of protracted fighting between Russia-backed separatists from the self-proclaimed Donetsk and Luhansk People's Republics and the Ukrainian Armed Forces. Between 2014 and late 2021, the war in Donbas had taken the lives of more than 10,000 combatants (including Ukrainian soldiers, Russian soldiers, and separatist combatants), as well as 3,095 civilians.

Prior operations 

In February 2022, mass evacuations and general mobilization began in the DPR and LPR following aggravations along the "line of contact," the front line which had more or less remained static since 2014. On 21 February 2022, Russia officially recognized the DPR and LPR as sovereign states.

On 24 February 2022, Russian Armed Forces and the DPR and LPR quasi-states launched a full-scale invasion of Ukrainian territory across numerous fronts, including in the Donbas. Further north of the Donbas, Russian and allied forces began fighting in the battle of Kharkiv, as well as numerous other smaller battles aimed at capturing key Ukrainian cities and towns. In southern Donbas, the siege of Mariupol had begun, which would eventually destroy 95% of the city and potentially kill over 22,000 civilians. Between 24 February and 18 April, Russian forces did not conduct much activity along the line of contact, only launching small-scale reconnaissance efforts as well as small-scale artillery campaigns against Ukrainian military installations. On 11 March 2022, Russian tanks allegedly shelled a care home for the elderly in Kreminna, killing 56 civilians and wounding an unknown number of residents. According to Ukrainian authorities, an additional 15 civilians were abducted by Russian soldiers and taken to separatist territory in Luhansk Oblast.

On 25 March, Russian officials declared that the first phase of the "special military operation" in Ukraine was complete. On 29 March 2022, they declared that they intended to scale back their military operations in the region around the capital city of Kyiv. This effectively ended Russian operations in northern Ukraine and in Northeastern Ukraine. Russian military officials declared that the Ukrainian Navy and Air Force had been neutralized. They also stated that the DPR and LPR controlled 54% and 93% of Donetsk and Luhansk Oblasts, respectively. The tactical withdrawal of Russian forces from the north was completed by 6 April 2022. As Ukrainian forces regained previously occupied territory, evidence of Russian war crimes — including the Bucha massacre — were discovered.

On 8 April, Russian forces allegedly launched an attack on the Kramatorsk railway station. The attack killed 59 civilians, including seven children, and wounded 114 more. Ukrainian and Western officials described the attack as another Russian war crime, while the Russian Defense Ministry denied the accusations and instead claimed the attack to be a false-flag operation by Ukrainian forces, arguing that the Tochka-U missile used was not a part of the Russian arsenal but rather the Ukrainian one.

Prelude 
In mid-April 2022, U.S. intelligence reported that Russia was "repositioning" its military units to the Donbas. Russian units from Northern Ukraine battlefronts in Kyiv, Sumy, Chernihiv, and elsewhere were noted by Maxar satellite imagery to be relocating to the Donbas region, while reinforcements from regions in Belarus and Russia supplemented these units.

Russian Foreign Minister Sergey Lavrov acknowledged the beginning of a new offensive in Donbas, claiming it to be a "very important moment in this entire special operation." To address the new stage of the Russian offensive in Ukraine, French President Emmanuel Macron and US president Joe Biden held a meeting with representatives from France, Germany, the United Kingdom, Canada, Italy, Poland, and Romania. They were joined by NATO Secretary General Jens Stoltenberg, European Commission President Ursula Von der Leyen and European Council President Charles Michel.

Russian objectives
On 22 April the commander of Russia's Central Military District, Rustam Minnekayev, declared that the aim of the "second phase" of the country's invasion of Ukraine was to fully seize Donbas and Southern Ukraine and to establish a land corridor with Transnistria, a Russian-occupied, internationally unrecognized breakaway republic that is instead internationally recognized as part of Moldova. He alleged that there was "evidence that the Russian-speaking population is being oppressed" in Transnistria. The Ministry of Defence of Ukraine replied to this announcement by describing Russia's intentions as imperialism, saying that it contradicted previous Russian claims that assured that Russia did not have territorial ambitions over Ukraine and that Russia had admitted that "the goal of the 'second phase' of the war is not victory over the mythical Nazis, but simply the occupation of eastern and southern Ukraine".

According to Russian sources, the official representative of the LPR forces, Andrey Marochko, stated on 3 July 2022 that in order to secure the LPR land, their, DPR and Russian forces must push the Ukrainian forces away from the LPR's borders for no less than 300 kilometers. The 300 km claim would mean the full Kharkiv Oblast and Donetsk region, parts of Dnipropetrovsk Oblast, Zaporizhzhia Oblast, Sumy Oblast and Poltava Oblast. Russian sources said that the LPR's ambassador in Russia, Rodion Miroshnik, confirmed on 4 July 2022 that LPR troops would continue to participate in the Donbas offensive, saying the presence of Ukrainian units along the LPR's borders would threaten security.

On 30 June 2022, ISW assessed that despite Russia's concentration in the east, they still had territorial ambitions beyond Luhansk and Donetsk Oblast.

Opposing forces

Russian and pro–Russian forces 

For the battle, the Russians used three armies along with a tank division and a rocket artillery brigade. By mid-April, Russia had concentrated upwards of 65 battalion tactical groups (BTGs) on the line of contact. Over the course of several days before 18 April, 11 BTGs were added to the existing Russian strength in the Donbas, bringing the total number of BTGs in the Donbas to 76, amounting to a total of about 60,000 troops.

The Union of Donbas Volunteers, a pro-Russian group of volunteers formed in 2014, was said to have an active strength of about 14,500 fighters.

Western media citing officials of the European Union have reported that 10,000–20,000 Libyan, Syrian, Ethiopian, and Wagner Group mercenaries were mobilized by Russian forces in the Donbas.

Ukraine 
For the battle, the Ukrainians had concentrated six regular brigades and the Georgian Legion. According to Forbes on 1 February, Ukraine's army consisted of 20 active brigades, meaning that 30% of the Ukrainian active forces, or around 51,000 soldiers, were organized in the Donbas. Additionally, units of the Territorial Defense force were active in the Donbas, along with an unknown number of civilian reserves, foreign volunteers, and partisans.

President Zelenskyy said on April 15 that Ukrainian forces numbered 44,000 in the Donbas region. On 19 April, the BBC reported that Ukrainian troops in the Donbas numbered 40,000–50,000 men.

Battle

Early operations (18–30 April 2022) 

On the night of 18 April 2022, Russian forces launched an intensive bombardment campaign against positions in Luhansk, Donetsk, and Kharkiv Oblasts. Russian shelling overnight in Donetsk killed two civilians and wounded nine, according to online news sources. Ukrainian president Volodymyr Zelenskyy announced that the "battle for Donbas" had begun. Russian artillery pounded cities in the Donbas, aiming at destroying critical infrastructure.

The head of the Luhansk regional military administration and effective governor of the oblast, Serhiy Haidai, called on the region's residents to evacuate immediately so as to not become hostages or be killed by the Russians.

By 25 April, Russian forces achieved a three-to-one numerical supremacy over the Ukrainian forces (the traditional number considered to be the requirement for an attacking force), concentrating upwards of 76 Battalion tactical groups (BTGs) with 800 personnel per BTG in the Donbas.

In the first week, Russian forces secured full control over Kreminna, advanced in Rubizhne, occupied large areas of Popasna, and continued to shell positions along the front line. According to a Ukrainian official, Russian forces captured 42 villages in the Donetsk Oblast, though she did not specify which villages had been captured.

In the Slobozhansky and Donetsk operational districts, Russian troops intensified offensive operations in some areas, attempting to break through the Ukrainian defenses along almost the entire front line in Donetsk, Kharkiv and Luhansk regions. Meanwhile, the Ukrainian government stated their forces launched a counterattack and recaptured the town of Marinka. Libyan and Syrian mercenaries likely associated with the Wagner Group allegedly clashed with Ukrainian forces in Popasna. The Ukrainian government claimed that 20–25 mercenaries had been killed.

Russian forces continued a slow, steady advance, capturing the towns of Popivka, Pischane, Novotoshkivske, Zarichne and Zhytlivka, and prepared to capture and advance past Popasna, advance southeast from Izium and westwards from Kreminna.

Between 22 April and 29 April, 110 DPR servicemen were killed and 451 were injured.

Intensified clashes (1–19 May 2022) 

Beginning in May, Russian troops launched intensified battles—marked by mass artillery campaigns followed by ground assaults—on Ukrainian positions across the front line.

By 7 May, the now largely destroyed city of Popasna was captured by Russian and Luhansk People Republic forces, with this being confirmed by the regional governor. By 12 May, it was reported that Russian forces had seized Rubizhne.

From 5–13 May, a major battle on the Donets river took place, with Ukrainian defenders successfully repelling multiple Russian attempts to cross the strategic river. The Ukrainian armed forces claimed to have destroyed an entire battalion of Russian forces, killing up to 1,000–1,500 soldiers. The Institute for the Study of War (ISW) think tank reported that out of a force of 550 Russian troops, 485 were killed and wounded, as well as 80 vehicles lost.

Ukraine claimed to have launched a counterattack against Russian forces near Izium on 15 May. On the same day, it was reported that Russian forces had captured the village of Dovhen'ke, south of Izium.

Russian breakthrough (20 May–3 July 2022) 

In late May, Russian forces made breakthroughs in many regions across the front line. Russian troops were seen to be using a new "cauldron" approach to their efforts, abandoning large encirclements in favor of smaller ones, which enabled them to make the first major gains of the battle.

On 20 May, Russian forces made further advances in the west and south of Popasna, with the aim of cutting off the road to Sievierodonetsk. Despite stiff Ukrainian resistance, Russian forces finally broke through in the Popasna area on 20 May. By 22 May, Russian forces managed to secure their route of advance and attempted to simultaneously push west towards Bakhmut and north to cut off-road links to Sievierodonetsk.

Russian forces were reported entering the town of Lyman on 23 May, fully capturing it by the 26th, whereas Ukrainian forces were reported leaving Sviatohirsk. By 24 May, Russian forces captured the town of Svitlodarsk.

On 1 June, Ukraine announced that 7080% of Sieverodonetsk had been captured by Russian forces. On 3 June, Ukraine claimed to have launched a counterattack to take back 20% of the city. On 8 June, however, the Ukrainian Army was pushed back to the outskirts of the city.

By mid-June, the general consensus in the military community was that Ukraine was almost out of ammunition and was heavily outgunned. A senior Ukrainian military official added that Ukraine was reliant on the West to supply weapons, as Russia had an advantage of 10 to 15 times more artillery systems than Ukraine, and that Western rocket systems were needed to destroy Russian artillery. Furthermore, despite Ukrainian forces using 5,000–6,000 rounds a day, specifically 155 mm Western-supplied rounds, they were still outgunned up to 40-to-1 in some locations.

With the breakthrough near Popasna significantly slowed by Ukrainian heavy guns, Russia began an offensive to the southeast of Popasna, aiming to bypass the Siverskyi Donets river and bombard Lysychansk from the south. The ISW assessed that Russian commanders had been given the deadline of 26 June to make a breakthrough and seize Luhansk Oblast's full administrative territory.

Fall of Sievierodonetsk and Lysychansk 

By 23 June, Russia had fully broken through in the south, seizing Toshkivka and making major gains south of Lysychansk. Russian forces captured , Myrna Dolyna,  and  all on 22 June. On 23 June, Russian forces cut off and surrounded the towns of Hirske and Zolote, which they claimed to have fully captured by next day. In addition, Russia made a push to fully secure the Azot chemical plant in Sievierodonetsk, which by 14 June had become the last refuge for Ukrainian soldiers in the city. From the north, Russian troops were less successful, attempting to make breakthroughs near Mykolaivka and Bohorodychne, in an attempt to advance on the Donetsk city of Sloviansk. Nonetheless, the Russian advance ground on, with Russia's breakthrough in the south putting pressure on the few remaining Ukrainian defenders of Luhansk Oblast to withdraw to defensive lines near the border with Donetsk Oblast.

Russian forces had fully encircled Hirske and Zolote in their drive north to Lysychansk by 24 June. Russian sources claimed that Ukrainian forces had suffered over 1,000 casualties, including 800 prisoners, in Hirske, Zolote and near Lysychansk over the previous two days. By 25 June, Ukrainian officials had announced that their troops had retreated from Sievierodonetsk in order to avoid being surrounded by Russian troops, signalling the city's capture. By 1 July, Russian forces continued encircling Lysychansk from the south and west, attempting to cut off the T1302 Lysychansk-Bakhmut highway from the city. As part of the encirclement, Russian forces claimed to have also seized Pryvillia, northwest of Lysychansk, after units made river crossings to the north and west of the town. Ukrainian positions near Siversk, Bilohorivka, Vovchoyarivka, Berestove, Yakovlivka, Vidrodzhennia, Mayorsk, and the Vuhlehirska thermal power plant were shelled by artillery.

On 2–3 July, Russia and LPR separatist forces claimed to have captured and controlled Lysychansk, however Ukrainian officials, including president Volodymyr Zelenskyy, had yet to officially acknowledge the strategic city's capture, only saying there were ongoing fierce clashes for the city. The Institute for the Study of War (ISW) supported the Russian claim that Lysychansk had fallen on 2 July, suggesting the Ukrainian defenders likely "deliberately withdrew" from the city. Furthermore, the Russian defence ministry claimed to have captured and were in the process of clearing many settlements on the Lysychansk outskirts, including Verkhnekamenka, Zolotarivka, Bilohorivka, Novodruzhesk, Maloryazantsevo, and Bila Hora. Ukrainian officials subsequently conceded that Lysychansk was captured.

With the fall of Lysychansk and its western outskirts, Russia and the Luhansk People's Republic declared full control of Luhansk Oblast for the first time, achieving an objective of the Russian-led campaign. Russian shelling of Sloviansk intensified on 3 July.

Russian operational pause (4–16 July 2022) 

After fully capturing and occupying Luhansk Oblast, Russian president Vladimir Putin ordered defence minister Sergei Shoigu to continue the offensive in Donbas as planned, adding that units that fought on the Luhansk front "should certainly rest and increase their combat capabilities." According to the Institute for the Study of War, Russian forces made no claimed or assessed territorial gains "for the first time in 133 days of war" and suggested that Russia was likely taking an "operational pause" to rest and regroup its forces before a planned renewed assault. The UK defence ministry expected the city of Siversk to be the immediate tactical objective of their renewed assault.

An intelligence briefing by the UK defence ministry on 4 July said Russian forces would "almost certainly" transition to capturing the rest of Donetsk Oblast, around 55 percent of which was already in control by Russian and Donetsk People's Republic (DPR) separatist forces. The ministry predicted the fighting in Donetsk would continue to be "grinding and attritional," typified by massive artillery shelling leveling towns and cities amid slow ground advances. Ukraine's governor of Luhansk, Serhiy Haidai said he expected Donetsk cities such as Sloviansk and Bakhmut to soon come under heavy Russian attack, and said both cities were increasingly being shelled. Similar to UK intelligence reports, the Ukrainians expected the Russians to push west along the Bakhmut-Lysychansk highway. On 5 July, the mayor of Sloviansk, urged residents to evacuate the city. "The nearest Russian positions are 7–10 km from the city," said Liakh. The governor of Donetsk Oblast, Pavlo Kyrylenko, urged the 350,000 remaining residents to evacuate the province.

Luhansk governor Serhiy Haidai claimed that an attempt by Russian regular and reserve troops to expand a bridgehead on the Donets river had been stalled by a Ukrainian artillery attack. Pro-Russian sources claimed the village of Spirne had been captured and advances were made during renewed ground assaults on the northern Donetsk village of Verkhnokamyansk; the claims were not independently confirmed at the time. Reportedly, both Russian and Ukrainian sources confirmed that Ukrainian forces had recaptured the village of Solodke in a limited counterattack.

On 11 July, President Zelenskyy dismissed the notion that there was an ongoing "operational pause" by the Russians, citing continued deadly shelling, air strikes, and continued reports of Ukrainian troops "repelling" various Russian assaults. Zelenskyy insisted that 34 Russian airstrikes in the past 24 hours were not indicative of an "operational pause".

On 16 July, the Russian Ministry of Defense announced that the operational pause had effectively finished.

Renewed assault on Donetsk Oblast (17 July–6 September 2022) 

By 17 July, Russian forces were in control of 55% of Donetsk Oblast. Donetsk People's Republic (DPR) Deputy Minister of Information Daniil Bezsonov stated on 25 July that the DPR expected to capture the entirety of Donetsk Oblast by the end of August. Various Russian and Western sources had previously reported that Russia intended to hold referendums in occupied areas by the first half of September, likely sometime around September 11, which is the unified voting day in the Russian Federation.

Between 17–20 July, Russian forces conducted repeated ground assaults east of Siversk and south of Bakhmut, but no major advancements were reported along the front line, with the Ukrainians claiming to have repelled many local assaults. On 21 July, the British defence ministry warned that the Russians were closing in on the Vuhlehirska Power Station, the second largest power plant in Ukraine, and were attempting to make a breakthrough there.

On 25 July, Russian forces gained control of Berestove. An LPR representative posted video footage of Wagner Group mercenaries in front of the entrance sign to Novoluhanske online, indicating that Russian troops had advanced into the town located roughly 25 km southeast of the Bakhmut outskirts. Several Russian sources also claimed that Russian forces had captured the Vuhlehirska power plant, located on the northern edge of Novoluhanske, and were actively clearing it, meanwhile the Ukrainian General Staff reported that the Russians only had "partial success" on that front. Pro-Russian sources said Wagner mercenary fighters took part in storming the power station and the fighting lasted several days before the plant was fully controlled by 26 July. The ISW suggested Ukrainian troops likely conducted a "controlled withdrawal" from the Vuhlehirska reservoir area north-west towards Semyhirya. A Ukrainian official confirmed the power plant's capture on 27 July.

On 26 July, the Ukrainian General Staff stated that Russian forces were fighting in the village of Semyhirya, west of the Vuhlehirska power plant. On 27 July, geolocated video footage posted online showed that Wagner mercenaries had reached Klynove, while pro-Russian Telegram channel Readovka claimed that Russian forces established control over Pokrovske. On 28 July, the Ukrainian General Staff said the Russians made small gains near Soledar and Vershyna and resumed assaults on Avdiivka and Pisky. The Ukrainians accused Russian troops of wearing Ukrainian uniforms during their ground assaults. The Ukrainian military claimed to have neutralised 270 Russian and pro-Russian troops and destroyed seven tanks on 28 July, and that they successfully repelled all assaults on Soledar-Vershnya and the Avdiivka-Pisky fronts. However, the separatists claimed Russian and DPR forces in the Avdiivka area had made significant advances north and east of the city.

On 29 July, an explosion killed and wounded scores of Ukrainian POWs in Russian-occupied Olenivka. As of 30 July, the perpetrator of the attack remained disputed. On 30 July, President Zelenskyy ordered all remaining civilians in the Donetsk region to evacuate. Between 200,000 and 220,000 civilians still lived in the unoccupied territory of Donetsk Oblast, according to Ukrainian estimates.

On 1 August, the British defence ministry said Russia had made slow progress on the Bakhmut axis during daily assaults in the last four days. Luhansk governor Serhiy Haidai alleged that Russian forces were attempting to recruit and mobilise residents in LPR-controlled cities such as Alchevsk. On 2 August, Russian defence minister Sergei Shoigu stated that Russian forces had captured six front line settlements in recent days: Berestove, Pokrovske, Novoluhanske, Semyhiria, Hryhorivka, and Stryapivka. On the same day, Russian forces captured Ukrainian positions around the Butivka Coal mine, southwest of Avdiivka, dislodging Ukrainian positions that had been held there since 2015. The Ukrainian General Staff also stated that Russian forces had "partial success" along the Vidrozhennya-Kodema line, about 20 km southeast of Bakhmut.

On 5 August, Russian sources claimed that Russian troops were actively fighting at the Knauf Gips Donbas gypsum factory on the southeastern outskirts of Soledar. Meanwhile, separatist authorities claimed that separate DPR brigades and Wagner Group forces had taken control of half of Marinka, but the Ukrainians reported the assaults on Marinka were unsuccessful. Geolocated footage posted by DPR troops also suggested Travneve was likely captured by this day. On 6 August, combat footage confirmed that Russian forces advanced into the eastern outskirts of Marinka. On 7 August, Russian forces pierced through the defenses of Pisky and reached the center of the settlement. Russian sources claimed the villages of Volodymyrivka and Stryapivka, located southeast of Soledar, were captured by 9 August. On 10 August, the DPR claimed to have captured Hladosove, west of Travneve. On 11 August, Russian and DPR sources claimed that roughly 90 percent of Pisky had been captured, and combat footage purportedly showed the Russians bombarding the village with TOS-1A thermobaric artillery. The Russian defence ministry claimed to have fully captured Pisky by 14 August, but the Ukrainian military denied that it had been captured. The ISW assessed that Pisky had been captured by 24 August.

On 29 August, Russian and DPR forces claimed to have captured Kodema, west of Semyhiria and 13 km southwest of Bakhmut, however, the Ukrainian General Staff reported to have repelled the advance on the settlement. Russian and separatist forces, including elements of Wagner mercenaries, were reportedly continuing to fight for control of Kodema on 31 August until finally capturing it on 6 September. The DPR's 3rd Brigade claimed they were also advancing from the outskirts of Horlivka (20 km south of Bakhmut), while Russian sources claimed that the 11th DPR Regiment took control of a bridge on the road that runs between Pisky and Pervomaiske (both on the northwestern outskirts of Donetsk city) and were continuing efforts to advance westward towards Pervomaiske.

Ukrainian counteroffensives (6 September–12 November 2022) 

On September 6, Ukrainian forces began a surprise counter-offensive on the Kharkiv front that resulted in Russian forces retreating over 1,000 square kilometres (390 sq mi) east, significantly weakening Russian flanks north of Sloviansk and allowing for Ukrainian counter-attacks around the Donetsk city of Lyman, which had been captured by Russian forces in late May.

By October 2022, Ukrainian forces had retaken several villages and towns in northern Luhansk and in the Svatove Raion in northern Donetsk, including Yatskivka, Novoliubivka, Nevske, Grekivka, Novoyehorivka, Nadiya, Andriivka, and Stelmakhivka, among others. On 1 October, Ukrainian forces entered Lyman after a short siege. Russian forces had fallen back to the P-66 highway near the Kharkiv-Luhansk Oblast border, anchored by the settlements of Svatove and Kreminna, the first city to be taken during the battle of Donbas. On 2–3 October, Ukrainian forces began attacking Kreminna and Svatove in an attempt to break the Russian front line along the P-66 in northern Luhansk. Ukrainian presidential advisor Oleksii Arestovych claimed Russian losses during the height of the counteroffensive reached up to 500 soldiers killed or wounded per day, however, these claims could not be independently verified. On 15 October, Russian forces reportedly disrupted a Ukrainian Starlink system in the Soledar-Bakhmut area after they destroyed a shortwave repeater.

By 2 November, the Soledar-Bakhmut-Donetsk city front became the epicenter of fighting in Ukraine, according to Ukrainian Deputy Defense Minister Hanna Maliar.

Renewed Russian offensive (12 November 2022–present) 

Russian forces launched a renewed offensive in southern Donetsk Oblast in early November, with Russian troops intensifying their attempts to break through Ukrainian defensive lines in Bakhmut, Soledar, Pavlivka, and Vuhledar. On 11 November, DPR forces were reported to have entered Pavlivka. Russian forces, including Wagner PMC fighters, overran defensive lines south of Bakhmut in late November, reportedly capturing the settlements of Kurdiumivka, Ozarianivka, Zelenopillia, and Andriivka by 30 November, while clashes in Opytne continued. Multiple Russian sources also reported that Wagner fighters had captured and were clearing Yakovlivka, located along Soledar's northeastern flank, by 7 December. The Russians claimed to have shot down a Ukrainian Mi-8 helicopter in Yakovlika on 8 December. Ukraine was reportedly rotating in fresh units in the Donbas by mid–December, particularly from the Kherson front. The 57th Motorized Brigade, 36th Marine Brigade, and the 46th Airmobile Brigade reinforced the Bakhmut front alongside the 24th Mechanized Brigade, relieving the 93rd, which defended Bakhmut and Soledar for months. The 28th Brigade reportedly rotated to Kostiantynivka and the 18th Marine Infantry Battalion, 35th Marine Brigade reinforced Nevelske and Pervomaiske.

Heavy clashes along the Bakhmut–Soledar axis continued by 10 December, typified by grueling trench warfare, drone warfare, artillery duels, and minor ground assaults amid freezing temperatures. President Zelenskyy accused Russia of having "destroyed" Bakhmut, saying there was "no residential space that hasn't been damaged by shelling for a long time." On 10 December, the Russian defense ministry said their forces made new advances on the Lyman axis. Meanwhile, the Ukrainian General Staff said more than 20 settlements were bombarded in fighting in the Bakhmut area alone. Ukrainian paratroopers of the 71st separate huntsman brigade reported repelling a Russian "sabotage and reconnaissance group" with mortar fire near Bakhmut, "eliminating" at least two attackers. The months-long battle of Marinka continued, with DPR president Denis Pushilin claiming on 15 December that 80 percent of the city had been captured amid ongoing heavy urban combat.

The Ukrainians reportedly increased shelling of Donetsk city in mid-December. DPR authorities said six civilians were killed in the city during shelling in early December. On 15 December, mayor Alexey Kulemzin said that "at approximately 7 a.m." the Ukrainians launched 40 Grad rockets at the city center, damaging residential and commercial buildings and the Transfiguration Cathedral, in what he called "the most massive strike since 2014." One person was killed and nine were wounded. On 16 December, Wagner PMC forces reportedly finished clearing Yakovlika, further threatening Soledar's northeastern flank.

The ISW assessed that the pace of Russia's Donbas advances in November–December was roughly equivalent to the pace in October. According to the ISW, Russian forces gained a total of 192 sq km in the Bakhmut sector between 1 October and 20 December. Footage posted online by a Russian journalist confirmed Russian forces had captured Andriivka (Bakhmut Raion), 10 km south of Bakhmut, by 22 December. The journalist claimed that Wagner fighters were fighting near Klishchiivka, where Ukraine reportedly had established strong defensive positions. Meanwhile, Ukraine continued to hold the northern half of Opytne and the western half of Marinka. On 26 December, President Zelenskyy referred to Ukraine's situation in the Donbas as "difficult," saying the Russians were "using all the resources available to them ... to squeeze out at least some advance." Ukraine's Eastern Military Command reported that the Bakhmut area was shelled 225 times on 26 December alone. Meanwhile, Russian sources reported Wagner had launched an offensive along the Soledar-Bakhmutske axis. In late December 2022 to early January 2023, Wagner fighters broke through Ukrainian defenses in Soledar, capturing the settlement by 16 January, along with capturing Klishchiivka, southwest of Bakhmut, on 19 January.

Foreign involvement

Support for Ukraine 

The Ukrainians continued a campaign of targeting Russian ammunition depots and logistics sites in Donetsk province with air strikes and, reportedly, U.S.-supplied M142 HIMARS or M270 rocket artillery systems. Video emerged of an apparent ammunition depot in the Snizhne, Donetsk region exploding, with pro-Ukrainian sources suggesting Ukrainian forces used M142 HIMARS supplied by the U.S. to attack the depot deep behind Russian-DPR front lines. Oleksiy Arestovych, a Ukrainian presidential advisor, claimed that continued attacks on Russian ammunition depots and increased Ukrainian artillery supplies from NATO countries were forcing the Russians to conserve artillery shells and rockets for the first time. He argued that if this trend continued, the Ukrainians would, eventually, achieve artillery and logistical superiority on the battlefield in the Donbas. President Zelenskyy, in his nightly public address, also hailed the impact Western-supplied artillery pieces were reportedly having on Russian logistics and strike capabilities. In late July 2022, Ukrainian soldiers and officers fighting in Donetsk offered anecdotal evidence of a significant reduction in Russian artillery fire.

The Mozart Group, a group of former Western soldiers serving as volunteers in Ukraine, is evacuating civilians and offering informal combat training to Ukrainian troops, primarily on casualty care and medical evacuation. Retired U.S. Marine Corps Colonel Andrew Milburn, the leader of the group, denied Russian accusations of Mozart being "American mercenaries" or a PMC akin to Wagner Group and said Mozart is legally classified as an NGO. In December 2022, Willburn suggested that Wagner fighters were probably targeting Mozart personnel, as three Donbas hotels the group had lodged in had all been hit by missiles. "There's no hotel in Donbas now that will let us stay because they've been told we're being targeted," said Milburn.

Support for Russia 
The United States assessed in late August 2022 that Russia had received Qods Mohajer-6 and Shahed-series UAVs from Iran over several days that month, as part of a Russian plan to obtain hundreds of such vehicles for use in the invasion of Ukraine; national security adviser Jake Sullivan had warned in July about such a plan. Also according to US sources, Russian operators undertook training in Iran as part of the deal. A US official said in late August that Russia had faced "numerous failures" with the vehicles.

On 9 December, Britain's ambassador to the UN Barbara Woodward said that the UK was "almost certain" that Russia was procuring weaponry from "North Korea [and] other heavily sanctioned states" to replenish diminishing stocks. Vassily Nebenzia, Russia's ambassador to the UN, denied suggestions that Russia was being supplied by Iran, stating Russia's military–industrial complex "can work perfectly fine and doesn't need anyone's assistance, whereas the Ukrainian military industry does not basically exist and is being assisted by the Western industry."

Casualties

Military casualties 
The Ukrainian government refrained from providing overall numbers of casualties to their own forces in the Donbas, although they did periodically offer various estimates of daily casualty counts. According to Ukraine, between 50 and 100 Ukrainian soldiers were being killed daily on the Donbas front as of late May 2022. By early June 2022, up to 200 Ukrainian soldiers were killed and 800+ wounded daily in the Donbas. By mid-June, some Ukrainian officials estimated that Ukrainian forces were sustaining well over the previous mark of 1,000 casualties per day, including 200–500 killed.

With respect to Russian casualties, the Ukrainian Operational Command East provided daily casualty claims of Russian troops until 2 July 2022.

During the fighting, an LPR battalion commander was killed when he and his fighters were surrounded by Ukrainian forces close to Kreminna and "fought to the last", according to the LPR. The clashes left an unknown number of killed and wounded.

On 18 July 2022, two Americans, a Canadian, and a Swedish national were killed during a Russian tank ambush during clashes near Hryhorivka, northeast of Siversk. The foreign fighters were part of a special operations unit of Ukraine's Territorial Defence Forces.

According to Ukrainian sources, more than 500 wounded Russian soldiers, most of them recently mobilized, were hospitalized in the occupied city of Horlivka between 10 and 16 November 2022.

Civilian casualties 

During the battle, Russia intensified its attacks on civilian areas. 60 civilians were believed to be killed and at least seven wounded due to a Russian airstrike on a school sheltering about 90 civilians in Luhansk Oblast, whereas the bodies of 44 civilians were recovered from rubble underneath an apartment building in Izium. During the battle of Kreminna, near Rubizhne and Lysychansk, Ukrainian forces lost control amid heavy fighting. More than 200 civilians were killed during the battle, with four additional civilians being killed and one more wounded as they attempted to escape the fighting. The Ukrainian government claimed that over 1,500 civilians were killed in Sievierodonetsk on 26 May. On 10 July, a Russian rocket attack in Chasiv Yar struck a multi-story residential building, killing at least 34 people.

As of 9 March, military activity related to the battle was confirmed to have killed at least 4,950 civilians and wounded over 5,100 more. As of 10 October, the United Nations counted 2,964 civilians killed in the Donetsk and Luhansk regions alone, in addition to 3,683 civilians wounded.

The true number of civilian deaths and injuries is guaranteed to be significantly higher. Civilian casualties are impossible to tabulate due to the fog of war and lack of information flow due to the military occupation of segments of Ukrainian territory. For example, according to Ukrainian sources, "thousands" of civilians were killed in Lysychansk, although official data only accounted for 150 killed civilians.

See also

 Outline of the Russo-Ukrainian War 
 Russian occupation of Donetsk Oblast
 Russian occupation of Luhansk Oblast
 Russian occupation of Kharkiv Oblast
 War in Donbas (2014 to the start of the 2022 Russian invasion of Ukraine)
 List of military engagements during the 2022 Russian invasion of Ukraine
 Timeline of the 2022 Russian invasion of Ukraine

References

Donbas
Battles of the war in Donbas
April 2022 events in Ukraine
May 2022 events in Ukraine
June 2022 events in Ukraine
July 2022 events in Ukraine
August 2022 events in Ukraine
September 2022 events in Ukraine
October 2022 events in Ukraine
November 2022 events in Ukraine
December 2022 events in Ukraine
Eastern Ukraine offensive
History of Luhansk Oblast
History of Donetsk Oblast
History of Kharkiv Oblast